Zatosetron (LY-277,359) is a drug which acts as an antagonist at the 5HT3 receptor It is orally active and has a long duration of action, producing antinauseant effects but without stimulating the rate of gastrointestinal transport. It is also an effective anxiolytic in both animal studies and human trials, although with some side effects at higher doses.

See also 
Ondansetron
Bemesetron
Granisetron
Ricasetron
Tropanserin
Tropisetron

References 

5-HT3 antagonists
Tropanes
Salicylamide ethers
Chloroarenes
Glycine receptor agonists
Glycine receptor antagonists